Pinneyum (English: Once Again) is a 2016 Indian Malayalam-language romantic crime drama film written, co-produced, and directed by Adoor Gopalakrishnan. Businessman Baby Mathew Somatheeram co-produced the film. The film portrays a love story where Dileep and Kavya Madhavan are in the lead roles. This film was loosely adapted from the murder incident in Kerala during 1984 by Sukumara Kurup, a wanted criminal.

Plot 
A man, Anand Sharma, is found dead in a hotel room. The story changes to Purushothaman Nair, a graduate who has been unemployed for the past eight years, lives with his wife Devi, daughter Revathi, his father-in-law Pappu Pillai, and his sickly brother-in-law Kuttan in Pillai's house. In his free time, Nair enjoys reading detective novels. He gets a call back for a job in the Gulf. From then on, people's attitudes toward him change. He is well respected in his village and freely offers assistance to people who come to him for help, but he begins to become greedy. 

In an effort to make more money he devises a plan to fake his death to get insurance money. Along with his father-in-law and Devi's uncle, Nair decides to put a dead body in his car and then burn it to make it appear as though he was burned along with the car. Because the trio cannot find a body, they decide to kill a man and use his body. Driving at night, they come across a man who asks for a ride to the hospital where his first child was being born. Devi's uncle strangles the man to death and the three of them place him in the driver's seat and proceed to burn the car. Everyone (except Devi, to whom Nair had told the whole plan) considers Nair dead, while Nair disappears. Forensic reports, however, soon reveal that the man killed in the car was not Nair but an unidentified person. Police arrest Kuttan, Pillai, and Devi's uncle for questioning, where Kuttan is thrashed. The other two surrender, saying that the man was killed by accident and, being afraid of the consequences, they had burned his body along with the car. 

Seventeen years pass and it is revealed that Kuttan remains bed-ridden from the thrashing, Pillai refuses to see anyone in jail, Devi's uncle has died in jail, and Nair is still missing. One night, a man comes to Devi's window and calls out to her. When he sees that she is frightened, he reveals that he is Nair. He had undergone plastic surgery to escape from authorities and now lives under the alias Anand Sharma. Frightened and not believing him, Devi threatens to call the police, which makes him leave. He returns for a few nights, and Devi finally accepts that he is her husband. She refuses to join him in his new life, however, claiming that he destroyed her and her family's life and does not want to see him again. Nair returns the next night, tells her that he will not come into her life again, and leaves. 

The first scene of the movie continues where the police find a suicide note under Sharma's bed in the hotel room in which he had written, "I have one request. Do not go in search of who I am. I, myself, do not know who I am." This leaves everyone puzzled.

Cast 
 Dileep as Purushothaman Nair
Subodh Bhave as Anand Sharma (Purushothaman Nair after plastic surgery)
 Kavya Madhavan  as Devi
 Nedumudi Venu as Pappu Pilla 
 Vijayaraghavan as Manikandan Nair
 Akshara Kishor as Revathi
 Indrans as Kuttan Pillai
 K. P. A. C. Lalitha
 Nandhu as Ayyappan Kurup
 Sathi Premji
 Srinda Ashab as Sharada 
 Meera Nallur
 Krishnan Balakrishnan
 Arun Benny as Poovarasan Eetrajavum

Production
Adoor Gopalakrishnan announced Pinneyum after eight years with Dileep in a press meeting on 23 March 2016. Filming started on 11 May 2016 in Sasthamkootta, the main location. Pinneyum was Gopalakrishnan's first digital film.

References

External links
 

Films shot in Kollam
2010s Malayalam-language films
Romantic crime films